Simon Coates may refer to:

Simon Coates (actor), British actor
Simon Coates (artist), British artist